The 2005 WNBA season was their seventh season and their third in Connecticut. The Sun attempted to return to the postseason for the third consecutive season and were successful. They also attempted to return to the WNBA Finals for the second consecutive year and were successful.

Offseason

WNBA Draft

Transactions
May 16: The Sun waived Maria Conlon and Anna Montanana.
May 11: The Sun waived Jess Strom.
May 9: The Sun waived Jennifer Lacy.
May 5: The Sun signed Taj McWilliams-Franklin to a contract extension.
May 5: The Sun waived Erika Valek.
May 3: The Sun waived Candace Futrell.
April 29: The Sun waived Katie Endress, Beth Swink, Dena Williams, Petra Glaeser, and Shannon Howell.
April 27: The Sun signed Beth Swink and Jennifery Lacy.
April 22: The Sun signed Jess Strom.
April 21: The Sun signed Katie Endress.
April 19: The Sun signed Anna Montanana.
April 18: The Sun signed Dena Williams and Maria Conlon.
April 13: The Sun signed Erika Valek.

Roster

Season standings

Schedule

Preseason

|- align="center" bgcolor="bbffbb"
| 1
|  May 1
|  Minnesota
| W 76-71
| Whalen (13)
| Willingham (7)
| N/A
| Mohegan Sun Arena
| 1-0
|- align="center" bgcolor="bbffbb"
| 2
|  May 8
|  Charlotte
| W 69-64
| Jones (15)
| Jones (6)
| N/A
| Mohegan Sun Arena
| 2-0
|- align="center" bgcolor="ffbbbb"
| 3
|  May 12
|  @ Houston
| L 57-67
| Whalen, Sales (14)
| Dydek, Sales (7)
| N/A
| Toyota Center
| 2-1
|- align="center" bgcolor="bbffbb"
| 4
|  May 14
|  @ Minnesota
| W 91-66
| Whalen (16)
| McWilliams-Franklin (9)
| N/A
| Target Center
| 3-1
|-

Regular season

|- align="center" bgcolor="ffbbbb"
| 1
|  May 21
|  @ Detroit
| L 67-78
| McWilliams-Franklin (25)
| McWilliams-Franklin (10)
| Whalen (7)
| Palace of Auburn Hills9,245
| 0-1
|- align="center" bgcolor="bbffbb"
| 2
|  May 22
|  @ Washington
| W 68-67
| Douglas (16)
| McWilliams-Franklin (6)
| Whalen (4)
| MCI Center11,155
| 1-1
|- align="center" bgcolor="bbffbb"
| 3
|  May 28
|  Phoenix
| W 85-68
| McWilliams-Franklin (25)
| McWilliams-Franklin (9)
| Whalen (6)
| Mohegan Sun Arena9,341 (sellout)
| 2-1
|-

|- align="center" bgcolor="bbffbb"
| 4
|  June 4
|  San Antonio
| W 80-69
| Douglas, Dydek, McWilliams-Franklin (15)
| Jones (7)
| Douglas, Whalen (6)
| Mohegan Sun Arena6,252
| 3-1
|- align="center" bgcolor="bbffbb"
| 5
|  June 7
|  Seattle
| W 81-69
| Douglas (20)
| Dydek (14)
| Whalen (8)
| Mohegan Sun Arena7,080
| 4-1
|- align="center" bgcolor="bbffbb"
| 6
|  June 10
|  @ Houston
| W 77-57
| Sales (21)
| Dydek (12)
| Whalen (6)
| Toyota Center5,736
| 5-1
|- align="center" bgcolor="bbffbb"
| 7
|  June 11
|  @ San Antonio
| W 78-69
| McWilliams-Franklin (17)
| Douglas, McWilliams-Franklin (9)
| Whalen (6)
| AT&T Center9,772
| 6-1
|- align="center" bgcolor="bbffbb"
| 8
|  June 18
|  Detroit
| W 73-63
| Sales (17)
| McWilliams-Franklin (10)
| Whalen (6)
| Mohegan Sun Arena7,427
| 7-1
|- align="center" bgcolor="bbffbb"
| 9
|  June 20
|  @ Los Angeles
| W 90-70
| Sales (26)
| Dydek (10)
| Douglas, Whalen (6)
| STAPLES Center7,246
| 8-1
|- align="center" bgcolor="ffbbbb"
| 10
|  June 22
|  @ Seattle
| L 86-95
| McWilliams-Franklin (21)
| Dydek, McWilliams-Franklin, Whalen (5)
| Whalen (6)
| KeyArena8,120
| 8-2
|- align="center" bgcolor="bbffbb"
| 11
|  June 24
|  @ Sacramento
| W 61-50
| McWilliams-Franklin (15)
| McWilliams-Franklin (14)
| Whalen (3)
| ARCO Arena10,067
| 9-2
|- align="center" bgcolor="bbffbb"
| 12
|  June 25
|  @ Phoenix
| W 77-69
| Sales (22)
| Wyckoff (9)
| Sales, Wyckoff (3)
| US Airways Center8,091
| 10-2
|- align="center" bgcolor="bbffbb"
| 13
|  June 28
|  Sacramento
| W 70-66
| Sales (19)
| McWilliams-Franklin (7)
| Whalen (5)
| Mohegan Sun Arena6,789
| 11-2
|- align="center" bgcolor="bbffbb"
| 14
|  June 30
|  Minnesota
| W 71-56
| Sales (18)
| McWilliams-Franklin (9)
| Whalen (6)
| Mohegan Sun Arena6,869
| 12-2
|-

|- align="center" bgcolor="ffbbbb"
| 15
|  July 7
|  @ New York
| L 79-89
| Whalen (24)
| McWilliams-Franklin (8)
| Whalen (5)
| Madison Square Garden
| 12-3
|- align="center" bgcolor="ffbbbb"
| 16
|  July 13
|  @ Indiana
| L 53-64
| Sales (15)
| Douglas (7)
| Whalen (4)
| Conseco Fieldhouse
| 12-4
|- align="center" bgcolor="bbffbb"
| 17
|  July 15
|  Houston
| W 70-66
| Sales (22)
| Dydek (7)
| Whalen (5)
| Mohegan Sun Arena
| 13-4
|- align="center" bgcolor="bbffbb"
| 18
|  July 17
|  @ Minnesota
| W 72-53
| Dydek (17)
| Dydek (8)
| Douglas, Dydek (4)
| Target Center
| 14-4
|- align="center" bgcolor="bbffbb"
| 19
|  July 19
|  @ Charlotte
| W 64-55
| Douglas (15)
| Dydek (11)
| Whalen (6)
| Charlotte Bobcats Arena
| 15-4
|- align="center" bgcolor="ffbbbb"
| 20
|  July 20
|  @ Detroit
| L 57-66
| Sales (17)
| McWilliams-Franklin (11)
| Sales, Whalen, Wyckoff (3)
| Palace of Auburn Hills
| 15-5
|- align="center" bgcolor="bbffbb"
| 21
|  July 22
|  Charlotte
| W 73-63
| Sales (21)
| Sales (8)
| Whalen (7)
| Mohegan Sun Arena
| 16-5
|- align="center" bgcolor="bbffbb"
| 22
|  July 26
|  Indiana
| W 68-55
| Sales (19)
| Dydek (12)
| Whalen (5)
| Mohegan Sun Arena
| 17-5
|- align="center" bgcolor="bbffbb"
| 23
|  July 28
|  New York
| W 73-70
| Sales (21)
| Douglas, Jones, McWilliams-Franklin (6)
| Whalen (6)
| Mohegan Sun Arena
| 18-5
|- align="center" bgcolor="ffbbbb"
| 24
|  July 30
|  Detroit
| L 66-75
| Dydek (16)
| Dydek (9)
| Douglas (4)
| Mohegan Sun Arena
| 18-6
|-

|- align="center" bgcolor="bbffbb"
| 25
|  August 2
|  @ New York
| W 72-65
| McWilliams-Franklin (19)
| McWilliams-Franklin (7)
| Whalen (6)
| Madison Square Garden
| 19-6
|- align="center" bgcolor="bbffbb"
| 26
|  August 6
|  @ Indiana
| W 74-65
| Sales (26)
| McWilliams-Franklin (12)
| Whalen (6)
| Conseco Fieldhouse
| 20-6
|- align="center" bgcolor="bbffbb"
| 27
|  August 9
|  Los Angeles
| W 64-51
| Douglas (22)
| Douglas (8)
| Whalen (6)
| Mohegan Sun Arena
| 21-6
|- align="center" bgcolor="bbffbb"
| 28
|  August 11
|  @ Washington
| W 80-65
| Sales (20)
| McWilliams-Franklin (10)
| Douglas, Whalen (4)
| MCI Center
| 22-6
|- align="center" bgcolor="bbffbb"
| 29
|  August 14
|  Washington
| W 80-77
| Sales (17)
| McWilliams-Franklin (7)
| Douglas (5)
| Mohegan Sun Arena
| 23-6
|- align="center" bgcolor="bbffbb"
| 30
|  August 18
|  Charlotte
| W 84-70
| Whalen (28)
| McWilliams-Franklin (11)
| Whalen (6)
| Mohegan Sun Arena
| 24-6
|- align="center" bgcolor="ffbbbb"
| 31
|  August 20
|  New York
| L 58-64
| Whalen (22)
| McWilliams-Franklin (11)
| Sales, Whalen (3)
| Mohegan Sun Arena
| 24-7
|- align="center" bgcolor="ffbbbb"
| 32
|  August 23
|  Indiana
| L 63-69
| McWilliams-Franklin (16)
| McWilliams-Franklin (4)
| Whalen (5)
| Mohegan Sun Arena
| 24-8
|- align="center" bgcolor="bbffbb"
| 33
|  August 26
|  Washington
| W 81-47
| Sales (20)
| Dydek (11)
| Whalen (4)
| Mohegan Sun Arena
| 25-8
|- align="center" bgcolor="bbffbb"
| 34
|  August 27
|  @ Charlotte
| W 78-69
| Jones (22)
| Dydek, Jones (9)
| Whalen (4)
| Charlotte Bobcats Arena
| 26-8
|-

Playoffs

In the first round of the Eastern Conference Playoffs, the Sun had to face the Detroit Shock. Since the Sun had the better record, the series would be played with game 1 at Detroit, game 2 at Connecticut, and game 3 (if needed) at Connecticut. Even though Detroit had won three of the four regular season meetings, the Sun swept the Shock and game 3 was not needed.
In the second round of the Eastern Conference Playoffs, the Sun had to face the Indiana Fever. Again, the Sun had the better record and the series would be played with game 1 at Indiana and games 2 and 3 (if needed) at Connecticut. The Sun swept the Fever and game 3 was not needed.
The Sun advanced to the WNBA Finals. The team would be facing off against the Sacramento Monarchs. The Sun had the better record so the series would be played with games 1, 2, and 5 at Connecticut and games 3 and 4 at Sacramento. In the regular season, the Sun had beaten the Monarchs in both meetings. It was not enough, however. The Monarchs beat the Sun 3 games to 1 to win the WNBA Finals.
For the third consecutive season, the Sun qualify for the Eastern Conference Playoffs.
For the third consecutive season, the Sun advance to the Eastern Conference Finals.
For the second consecutive season, the Sun advance to the WNBA Finals.

|- align="center" bgcolor="bbffbb"
| 1
|  August 31
|  @ Detroit
| W 73-62
| Sales (19)
| McWilliams-Franklin (9)
| Whalen (5)
| Palace of Auburn Hills5,930
| 1-0
|- align="center" bgcolor="bbffbb"
| 2
|  September 2
|  Detroit
| W 75-67
| Whalen (27)
| Sales (12)
| Whalen (3)
| Mohegan Sun Arena8,167
| 2-0
|-

|- align="center" bgcolor="bbffbb"
| 1
|  September 8
|  @ Indiana
| W 73-68
| McWilliams-Franklin (24)
| Whalen (7)
| Douglas (3)
| Conseco Fieldhouse8,777
| 1-0
|- align="center" bgcolor="bbffbb"
| 2
|  September 10
|  Indiana
| W 77-67 (OT)
| McWilliams-Franklin (15)
| McWilliams-Franklin, Dydek (7)
| Whalen, Derevjanik (4)
| Mohegan Sun Arena7,588
| 2-0
|-

|- align="center" bgcolor="ffbbbb"
| 1
|  September 14
|  Sacramento
| L 55-79
| Sales (23)
| McWilliams-Franklin (10)
| Sales (4)
| Mohegan Sun Arena8,157
| 0-1
|- align="center" bgcolor="bbffbb"
| 2
|  September 15
|  Sacramento
| W 77-70 (OT)
| McWilliams-Franklin (24)
| McWilliams-Franklin (16)
| Sales, Carey, Derevjanik (4)
| Mohegan Sun Arena8,444
| 1-1
|- align="center" bgcolor="ffbbbb"
| 3
|  September 18
|  @ Sacramento
| L 55-66
| Sales (17)
| McWilliams-Franklin (13)
| McWilliams-Franklin, Whalen, Sales (2)
| ARCO Arena14,073
| 1-2
|- align="center" bgcolor="ffbbbb"
| 4
|  September 20
|  @ Sacramento
| L 59-62
| Jones (21)
| McWilliams-Franklin (10)
| Whalen (5)
| ARCO Arena15,002
| 1-3
|-

Depth

Player stats
http://www.wnba.com/sun/stats/2005/

Awards and honors
Taj McWilliams-Franklin and Nykesha Sales were named to the WNBA All-Star team.
Taj McWilliams-Franklin was named to the All-WNBA Second Team.
Katie Douglas was named to the All-Defensive First Team.
Taj McWilliams-Franklin was named to the All-Defensive Second Team.
Taj McWilliams-Franklin was given the Kim Perrot Sportsmanship Award.
Lindsay Whalen was given the Off Season Community Assist Award.
Taj McWilliams-Franklin was named WNBA Player of the Week for the week of June 13, 2005.
Lindsay Whalen was named WNBA Player of the Week for the week of June 27, 2005.
Katie Douglas was named WNBA Player of the Week for the week of August 15, 2005.

References

External links

Connecticut Sun seasons
Connecticut
Eastern Conference (WNBA) championship seasons
Connecticut Sun